Daniel Rossi (born 29 August 1920) was a Uruguayan fencer. He competed in the individual and team foil events at the 1948 Summer Olympics.

References

External links
 

1920 births
Possibly living people
Sportspeople from Montevideo
Uruguayan male foil fencers
Olympic fencers of Uruguay
Fencers at the 1948 Summer Olympics
20th-century Uruguayan people